Old Bnai Zion Synagogue, also known as Sunset Palace, is a historic synagogue at 906 N. El Paso Street in El Paso, Texas. It was built in 1916 and added to the National Register in 1984.

It served as synagogue from 1912 to 1917, serving El Paso's first Jewish community.  It served St. Nicholas Greek Church from 1927 through at least 1934.  In 1984 it was serving as a dance studio, Sunset Palace, as well as sometimes as a social center and church.

See also

National Register of Historic Places listings in El Paso County, Texas
Recorded Texas Historic Landmarks in El Paso County

References

External links

Former synagogues in Texas
Buildings and structures in El Paso, Texas
Religion in El Paso, Texas
National Register of Historic Places in El Paso County, Texas
Recorded Texas Historic Landmarks
Texas State Antiquities Landmarks
Synagogues on the National Register of Historic Places in Texas
Synagogues completed in 1916
1916 establishments in Texas
Gothic Revival architecture in Texas
Neoclassical architecture in Texas
Gothic Revival synagogues
Neoclassical synagogues